Knefler is a surname. Notable people with the surname include:

 Frederick Knefler (1824–1901), American Union Army general
 Otto Knefler (1923–1986), German football player and manager

See also
 Kneller